Kid Candidate is an 2021 American documentary film directed and produced by Jasmine Stodel. It follows Hayden Pedigo, who runs for city council in Amarillo, Texas.

It had its world premiere at South by Southwest on March 16, 2021. It was released on July 2, 2021, by Gunpowder & Sky.

Synopsis
The film follows Hayden Pedigo, who runs for city council in Amarillo, Texas.

Release
The film had its world premiere at South by Southwest on March 16, 2021. It was released on July 2, 2021, by Gunpowder & Sky.

Reception
Kid Candidate holds a 82% approval rating on review aggregator website Rotten Tomatoes, based on 17 reviews, with a weighted average of 6.20/10.

References

External links
 
 

2021 films
2021 documentary films
American documentary films
Documentary films about American politics
Films shot in Texas
2020s English-language films
2020s American films